In mathematics and theoretical physics, the Eguchi–Hanson space is a non-compact, self-dual, asymptotically locally Euclidean (ALE) metric on the cotangent bundle of the 2-sphere T*S2. The holonomy group of this 4-real-dimensional manifold is SU(2). The metric is generally attributed to the physicists Tohru Eguchi and Andrew J. Hanson; it was discovered independently by the mathematician Eugenio Calabi around the same time in 1979.

The Eguchi-Hanson metric  has  Ricci tensor equal to zero, making it a solution to the vacuum Einstein equations of general relativity, albeit with Riemannian rather than Lorentzian metric signature. It may be regarded as a resolution of the A1 singularity according to the ADE classification which is the singularity at the fixed point of the C2/Z2 orbifold where the Z2 group inverts the signs of both complex coordinates in C2. The even dimensional space of dimension  can be described using complex coordinates  with a metric

Aside from its inherent importance in pure geometry, the space is important in string theory. Certain types of K3 surfaces can be approximated as a combination of several Eguchi–Hanson metrics since both have the same holonomy group.

The Eguchi–Hanson metric is the prototypical example of a gravitational instanton; detailed expressions for the metric are given in that article. It is then an example of a hyperkähler manifold.

References 

Differential geometry
String theory